Caravan of Light is an album by David Arkenstone, released in 2000, on African themes and subjects, with some farther travels along the great caravan roads of the Old World. Once again Arkenstone combines elements of new age and world music with an orchestral, cinematic flair. It has an unusual number of tracks with vocals for his work.

Track listing
"Inshallah" – 5:58
"Skies of Africa" – 4:25
"The Jade Mountain" – 5:30
"The Road to Zanzibar" – 4:55
"Jewels of the Night" – 6:00
"Dance in the Desert" – 5:59
"The Spice Road" – 3:42
"Rendezvous" – 5:29
"Under the Gypsy Moon" – 4:22
"Through the Marketplace" – 4:54
"Caravan of Light" – 5:40

Personnel
 David Arkenstone – guitar, vocals on "Inshallah" & "Caravan of Light", bouzouki, percussion, ebow, programming, keyboards
 Don Markese – flutes, clarinet, saxophone, pennywhistle
 Charlie Bisharat – violin
 Karen Hwa-Chee Han – er-hu
 Chad Watson – bass
 John Wakefield – percussion, marimba
 Sather Charron – didgeridoo
 Diane Arkenstone – vocals on "Jewel of the Night", wood flutes, synthesizers
 Andre Manga – vocals on "Skies of Africa"
 Valerie Fahren – lead vocal on "The Road to Zanzibar"
 Carlos Murguia – vocals on "Under the Gypsy Moon"

2000 albums
David Arkenstone albums
Narada Productions albums